Pasulj (from phaseolus), grah or grav is a bean stew made of usually white, cranberry or pinto beans, and more rarely kidney beans that is a popular dish in Balkan cuisine. It is normally prepared with meat, particularly smoked meat such as smoked bacon, sausage, and ham hock, and is a typical winter dish. Other commonly used ingredients include carrots and onions. Another version of the dish using baked beans is known as prebranac.

It is sometimes known in English as Serbian bean soup, and in German-speaking countries as Serbische Bohnensuppe ("Serbian bean soup"). In North Macedonia, a spicy and thicker variant is known as tavče gravče (beans on a skillet).

The idiom  ("simple as pasulj") equates to English as easy as pie and French simple comme chou.

See also

 List of bean soups
 List of legume dishes
 List of soups

References

Balkan cuisine
Albanian cuisine
Croatian cuisine
Serbian cuisine
Legume dishes
Sausage dishes
Montenegrin cuisine
Bean soups
National dishes